María Angélica Cubillán Chourio (born 22 April 1981) is a Venezuelan athlete specialising in the discus throw. She won several medals at the regional level.

Her personal best of 55.57 metres (2009) is the current national record.

Competition record

References

1981 births
Living people
Venezuelan female discus throwers
Central American and Caribbean Games gold medalists for Venezuela
Competitors at the 2010 Central American and Caribbean Games
Central American and Caribbean Games medalists in athletics
20th-century Venezuelan women
21st-century Venezuelan women